Ferdinando Gliozzi (born 1940)  is a string theorist at the Istituto Nazionale di Fisica Nucleare. Along with David Olive and Joël Scherk, he proposed the GSO projection to map out the tachyonic states in the Neveu–Schwarz sector.

References

Italian string theorists
Living people
1940 births